Rhodopirellula rosea is a Gram-negative and motile bacterium from the genus of Rhodopirellula which has been isolated from a dead  ark clam (Scapharca broughtonii) from the Gangjin Bay in Korea.

References

Bacteria described in 2014
Planctomycetota